HD 108147 b is a gas giant exoplanet with a minimum mass about half that of Jupiter. It orbits the star in a very tight "torch orbit". The distance between the planet and the star is only a tenth of the distance between Earth and the Sun (0.1AU). A number of such worlds are known to exist, but the eccentricity of this planet is unusually high. Planets orbiting very close to their parent stars usually have round orbits because of the tidal forces between the bodies.

In December 2019, the International Astronomical Union announced the exoplanet will bear the name Tumearandu, after the popular character Tumé Arandú of the folklore of Paraguay. The name was a result of a contest ran in Paraguay by the Centro Paraguayo de Informaciones Astronómicas, along with the IAU100 NameExoWorlds 2019 global contest.

See also
 HD 107148 b

References

External links 
 

Exoplanets discovered in 2002
Giant planets
Crux (constellation)
Exoplanets detected by radial velocity
Exoplanets with proper names
Hot Jupiters